Emoia tuitarere is a species of lizard in the family Scincidae. It is found in the Cook Islands.

References

Emoia
Reptiles described in 2011
Taxa named by George Robert Zug
Taxa named by Alison M. Hamilton
Taxa named by Christopher C. Austin